The 1999 Copa Colsanitas was a women's tennis tournament played on outdoor clay courts at the Club Campestre El Rancho in Bogotá in Colombia that was part of Tier IVa of the 1999 WTA Tour. It was the second edition of the tournament and was held from February 15 through February 21, 1999.

Finals

Singles

 Fabiola Zuluaga defeated  Christína Papadáki, 6–1, 6–3
 It was Zuluaga's 1st title of the year and the 1st of her career.

Doubles

 Seda Noorlander /  Christína Papadáki defeated  Laura Montalvo /  Paola Suárez, 6–4, 7–6(7–5)

Entrants

Seeds

Other entrants
The following players received wildcards into the singles main draw:
  Mariana Mesa
  Catalina Castaño

The following players received wildcards into the doubles main draw:
  María Adelaida Agudelo /  Jenny Andrade

The following players received entry from the singles qualifying draw:

  Luciana Masante
  Romina Ottoboni
  Celeste Contín
  Cristina Arribas

The following player received entry as a lucky loser:

  Alice Canepa

The following players received entry from the doubles qualifying draw:

  Jelena Dokić /  Inés Gorrochategui

External links
 Official website
 WTA Tournament Profile

Copa Colsanitas
Copa Colsanitas
1999 in Colombian tennis